The India national cricket team toured New Zealand from 15 January to 22 February 1976 and played a three-match Test series against New Zealand. The series was drawn 1–1.

Tour matches

Three-day: Central Districts v Indians

One-day: Wellington v Indians

Three-day: Northern Districts v Indians

Three-day: Otago v Indians

Test Matches

1st Test

2nd Test

3rd Test

ODI series

1st ODI

2nd ODI

External links
 Tour home at ESPN Cricinfo
 India to New Zealand & West Indies 1975-76 at test-cricket-tours.co.uk
 

1976 in Indian cricket
1976 in New Zealand cricket
1975-76
International cricket competitions from 1975–76 to 1980
New Zealand cricket seasons from 1970–71 to 1999–2000